Nublu may refer to:
 Nublu (musician), Estonian rapper
 Nublu, 1972 Estonian book by Jaan Rannap
 Nublu Club, East Village, Manhattan, New York